Beinn nan Eun is a hill in the Glen Artney Hills range immediately south of the Highland Boundary Fault, part of the Central Lowlands of Scotland. The second highest hill of the range, it does not share a boundary with Stirlingshire unlike its neighbour, Uamh Bheag. An impressive crag drops from its eastern side. Most ascents begin in Glen Artney itself to the north and take in the neighbouring hills, usually in an anti-clockwise direction, leaving it until last.

Subsidiary SMC Summits

References

Mountains and hills of Perth and Kinross
Donald mountains